Lady Helan 贺兰氏, (7th century – 666 CE) was the Lady of Wei (魏国夫人) during the Tang Dynasty and the niece of Wu Zetian. The Lady of Wei was an honorific for relatives of the Emperor and Empress. She was involved in court politics during her lifetime. She was killed by being poisoned at a dinner party.

Background
Lady Helan was the daughter of Wu Shun and Helan Yueshi. Wu Shun was the first daughter of Wu Shiyue and Lady Yang, and the older sister of Empress Wu. Helan Yueshi was the son of the Duke of Yingshan (应山公) and died early.

Lady of Wei
Lady Helan and her mother, Wu Shun, were favored by Emperor Gaozong who gave her the title Lady of Wei and her mother that of Lady of Han. 

Emperor Gaozong wanted to keep Lady Helan as a concubine, but Empress Wu found out and had the Lady of Wei killed by poisoning. She then blamed Wu Weiliang and Wu Huaiyun for the murder and they were executed. Lady Helan's brother, Helan Minzhi, suspected Empress Wu of murdering his sister and was exiled.

Modern Depictions
Lady Helan is well known in television series as Helan Minyue (贺兰敏月). She is often portrayed as an antagonist.
Portrayed by He Lin in the Palace of Desire 
Portrayed by Kathy Yuen in Secret History of Empress Wu
Portrayed by Sandra Ma in The Empress of China

References 

7th-century Chinese women
7th-century Chinese people
Tang dynasty imperial consorts
Wu Zetian